The 2004 Cork Senior Hurling Championship was the 115th staging of the Cork Senior Hurling Championship since its establishment by the Cork County Board in 1887. The draw for the 2003 opening round fixtures took place in December 2002. The championship began on 26 April 2003 and ended on 12 October 2003.

Blackrock entered the championship as the defending champions.

On 12 October 2003, Newtownshandrum won the championship following a 0-17 to 1-9 defeat of Blackrock in the final. This was their second championship title overall and their first title since 2000.

Newtownshandrum's Ben O'Connor was the championship's top scorer with 2-38.

Team changes

To Championship

Promoted from the Cork Intermediate Hurling Championship
 Delanys

Results

Preliminary round

Round 1

Round 2

Round 3

Quarter-finals

Semi-finals

Final

Championship statistics

Top scorers

Overall

In a single game

References

Cork Senior Hurling Championship
Cork Senior Hurling Championship